Corpus is Latin for "body". It may refer to:

Linguistics
 Text corpus, in linguistics, a large and structured set of texts
 Speech corpus, in linguistics, a large set of speech audio files
 Corpus linguistics, a branch of linguistics

Music
 Corpus (album), by Sebastian Santa Maria
 Corpus Delicti (band), also known simply as Corpus

Medicine
 Corpus callosum, a structure in the brain
 Corpus cavernosum (disambiguation), a pair of structures in human genitals
 Corpus luteum, a temporary endocrine structure in mammals
 Corpus gastricum, the Latin term referring to the body of the stomach
 Corpus alienum, a foreign object originating outside the body
 Corpus albicans
 Corpora amylacea
 Corpora arenacea

Other uses
 Corpus (Bernini), a 1650 sculpture of Christ by Gian Lorenzo Bernini
 Corpus (museum), a human body themed museum in the Netherlands
 Corpus Clock, a large sculptural clock
 Corpus (computers), a set of data used for benchmarking compression.
 Corpus (dance troupe), a Canadian dance troupe
 Corpus (typography), another name for long primer-size type
 Corpus, the figure of Christ on a crucifix
 Corpus fund, the capital generated for the continued sustenance of an organization
 Corpus, total amount of money invested by all investors in a mutual fund scheme
 The Corpus, a faction in the online game Warframe, organized as a cult that worships profit
 CORPUS, a dissident Catholic organisation

See also
 Corpus (archaeology), a sum collection or group of artifacts of one particular kind
 Habeas corpus, a legal mechanism to end detention of a suspect
 Corpus delicti, a legal term meaning "body of the crime"
 Corpus Christi (disambiguation)
 Corpus separatum (disambiguation), a form of political administration used in international conflict resolution
 Body (disambiguation)